Marxism–Leninism–Maoism–Prachanda Path (sometimes shortened to Prachanda Path) is the ideological line of the Unified Communist Party of Nepal (Maoist), also known as the UCPN(M). It is considered a development of Marxism–Leninism–Maoism (MLM) and named after the leader of the UCPN(M), Pushpa Kamal Dahal, commonly known as Prachanda. Prachanda Path was proclaimed in 2001. The ideology was partially inspired by the example of the Communist Party of Peru – Shining Path, which refers to its ideological line as Marxism–Leninism–Maoism–Gonzalo Thought.

Prachanda Path does not claim to make an ideological break with Marxism, Leninism or Maoism, but rather to be an extension of these ideologies based on the politics of Nepal. The doctrine came into existence after the party determined that the ideologies of Marxism, Leninism and Maoism could no longer be practiced completely as they had been in the past. The party adopted Prachanda Path as they felt it was a suitable ideology based on the reality of Nepalese politics. Militarily and in the context of the 1996–2006 civil war in Nepal, central to the ideology was the achievement of revolution through the control of rural areas and the encirclement of urban settlements.

Today, Prachanda's positions are seen by some Marxist–Leninist–Maoists around the world as "revisionist" and are criticized by revolutionary organizations within Nepal. These criticisms focus on the entry of the Unified Communist Party of Nepal (Maoist) into mainstream party politics in Nepal. These criticisms have also drawn on the cooperation between UCPN-M under Pushpa Kamal Dahal and the Communist Party of Nepal (Unified Marxist–Leninist).

See also 
 People's Liberation Army, Nepal
 People's Multiparty Democracy

References

External links
 A collection of articles by Prachanda and other leaders of the CPN (Maoist)
 Prachanda, follower of modern revisionism critique of Prachanda Path 

Eponymous political ideologies
Maoism in Nepal
Nepal Communist Party
Politics of Nepal
Types of socialism
Maoism
Politics of the Nepalese Civil War
2001 establishments in Nepal